Wilkes County is a county located in the US state of North Carolina. It is a part of the state's western mountain region. As of the 2020 census the population was 65,969, in 2010 the census listed the population at 69,340. Its county seat is Wilkesboro, and its largest town is North Wilkesboro. Wilkes County comprises the North Wilkesboro, NC, Micropolitan Statistical Area.

History
The county was formed from parts of Surry County and Washington District (now Washington County, Tennessee) on April 20, 1778, by an act of the North Carolina General Assembly of 1778. The first session of the county court was held in John Brown's house near what is today Brown's Ford. The act creating the county became effective on February 15, 1778, and the county celebrates its anniversary on February 15. Wilkes County was named for the English political radical John Wilkes, who lost his position as Lord Mayor of the City of London due to his support for the colonists during the American Revolution.

In 1799, the northern and western parts of Wilkes County became Ashe County. In 1841, parts of Wilkes County and Burke County were combined to form Caldwell County. In 1847, another part of Wilkes County was combined with parts of Caldwell County and Iredell County to become Alexander County. In 1849, additional parts of Wilkes County and Caldwell County were combined with parts of Ashe County and Yancey County to form Watauga County. Numerous boundary adjustments were made thereafter, but none resulted in new counties.

Moonshine production and the birth of NASCAR

Wilkes County was once known as the "Moonshine Capital of the World", and was a leading producer of illegal homemade liquor. From the 1920s to the 1950s some young Wilkes County males made their living by delivering moonshine to North Carolina's larger towns and cities. Wilkes County natives also used bootleg liquor as a means for barter far beyond the borders of North Carolina. Many Wilkes County distillers ran white liquor as far as Detroit, New Jersey, and South Florida. Since this often involved outrunning local police and federal agents in auto chases, the county became one of the birthplaces of the sport of stock-car racing.

The North Wilkesboro Speedway was the first NASCAR (National Association of Stock Car Auto Racing) track; it held its first race on May 18, 1947, and the first NASCAR-sanctioned race on October 16, 1949. Wilkes County native and resident Junior Johnson was one of the early superstars of NASCAR, as well as a legendary moonshiner. Johnson was featured by the writer Tom Wolfe in a 1965 Esquire magazine article titled "The Last American Hero Is Junior Johnson. Yes!", which gave him national exposure. Wolfe's vivid article was later adapted as the movie The Last American Hero (1973), starring Jeff Bridges and Valerie Perrine. Benny Parsons and Jimmy Pardue were two other notable NASCAR drivers from Wilkes.

The North Wilkesboro Speedway was closed following the 1996 NASCAR season. Two new owners, Bob Bahre and Bruton Smith, moved North Wilkesboro's NASCAR races to their tracks in Texas and New Hampshire. In 2009, Speedway Associates, Inc., obtained a three-year lease and started running races and other events at the speedway. However, in May 2011, the group announced that funding had fallen through and they were ending their lease prematurely. Following the track's closure in 1996, numerous news media stories and articles were written about the rich history of the speedway, the physical decay of the track and grandstands, and efforts to renovate and save the speedway. In November 2021, the North Carolina state legislature and North Carolina Governor Roy Cooper approved giving $18 million to the North Wilkesboro Speedway for extensive renovations and repairs in an effort to return auto racing to the track. Following the renovation, the Speedway held its first races in a decade in August 2022, drawing a sellout crowd to the CARS Tour's Window World 125. In September 2022 it was announced that the 2023 NASCAR All-Star Race will be held at the North Wilkesboro Speedway in May 2023, marking the first NASCAR race to be held at the track since 1996.

Geography

Wilkes County is located on the eastern slope of the Blue Ridge Mountains, a part of the Appalachian Mountains chain. The Blue Ridge Mountains run from the southwest to the northeast, and dominate the county's western and northern horizons. The Blue Ridge Parkway runs along the crest of the Blue Ridge on the county's northern and western borders. The foothills and valleys of the Blue Ridge form most of the county's midsection, with some elevations exceeding . Stone Mountain State Park, located in the foothills of northern Wilkes County, is one of the most popular state parks in North Carolina, and is noted for its excellent rock climbing and trout fishing. The Brushy Mountains, an isolated spur of the Blue Ridge, form the county's southern border. Wilkes County's terrain gradually becomes more level and less hilly as one moves to the east; the far eastern section of the county lies within the Piedmont region of North Carolina. The largest river in Wilkes is the Yadkin River, which flows through the central part of the county. The county's three other major streams, all of which flow into the Yadkin, are the Reddies River, Roaring River, and Mulberry Creek. Following the devastating floods of 1916 and 1940, the US Army's Corps of Engineers constructed the W. Kerr Scott Dam and Reservoir on the Yadkin River four miles west of Wilkesboro. Opened in 1962, the dam created a lake with a shoreline of 56 miles. The lake is used for boating, swimming, fishing, and waterskiing; it is especially noted for its excellent bass fishing.
The W. Kerr Scott lake is the largest body of water in Wilkes.

Due to its wide range of elevation, Wilkes County's climate varies considerably. In winter, it is not unusual for it to be sunny with the temperature in the forties in the county's eastern section, while at the same time it is snowing or sleeting with the temperature below freezing in the county's mountainous north, west, and south. Generally speaking, Wilkes receives ample amounts of precipitation, with frequent thunderstorms in the spring and summer months; and rain, snow, sleet, and freezing rain all occur at times during the winter, with the frequency increasing with the altitude. Wilkesboro, the county seat,  receives an average of 50 inches of rain per year and an average of 10 inches of snow. Severe weather is not common in Wilkes but does occur. Tornadoes are rare, but severe thunderstorms can bring strong winds which can down trees and power lines, as well as cause hail. On October 23, 2017, a rare EF 1 tornado touched down in the community of Moravian Falls, before moving into the towns of Wilkesboro and North Wilkesboro, and then through the Mulberry, Fairplains, and Hays communities, causing significant damage. Wilkes County is far enough inland that hurricanes rarely cause problems, but a strong hurricane which moves inland quickly enough may cause damage, as with Hurricane Hugo in 1989. Due to the numerous creeks and streams which run through its valleys, Wilkes is especially prone to devastating flash floods. The two most memorable floods occurred in 1916 and 1940, killing a number of residents and causing millions of dollars in damages. Since the opening of the W. Kerr Scott Dam in 1962, the Yadkin River has not flooded in the county. Although Wilkes County has never had a severe earthquake, a fault runs through the Brushy Mountains, and mild earth tremors are not uncommon. On August 31, 1861, an earthquake estimated at 5.0 on the Richter magnitude scale hit the southern part of the county and caused minor damage.

National protected area
 Blue Ridge Parkway (part)

State and local protected areas 
 Doughton Recreation Area (part)
 Rendezvous Mountain State Park
 Stone Mountain State Park (part)
 Thurmond Chatham Wildlife Management Area (part)

Major water bodies 
 Big Sandy Creek
 Big Warrior Creek
 Brier Creek
 Coal Creek
 Cub Creek
 Dugger Creek
 East Prong Roaring River
 Elk Creek
 Elkin Creek
 Fall Creek
 Fishing Creek
 Grassy Fork (Elkin Creek tributary)
 Hunting Creek
 Laurel Branch
 Little Dugger Creek
 Little Elkin Creek
 Little Hunting Creek
 Lousy Creek (Reddies River tributary)
 Mulberry Creek
 North Fork Reddies River
 North Little Hunting Creek
 Reddies River
 Roaring River
 Sandy Creek
 South Fork Reddies River
 W. Kerr Scott Dam and Reservoir
 Yadkin River
 Yates Creek

Adjacent counties

 Alexander County - south
 Alleghany County - north
 Ashe County - northwest
 Caldwell County - southwest
 Iredell County - southeast
 Surry County - northeast
 Watauga County - west
 Yadkin County - east

Major highways
 
 
 
 
 
 
 
  (Alternative Route)
 

Wilkes County is home to several NC and US Highways, as well as an airport and public transportation. Wilkes is also one of the twenty-seven NC counties which the Blue Ridge Parkway runs through.

Major infrastructure
 North Wilkesboro Speedway, famous speedway in Wilkes County.
 Wilkes County Airport
 Wilkes Transportation Authority serves Wilkes County with buses and vans along a scheduled route and rural service.

Demographics

2020 census

As of the 2020 United States census, there were 65,969 people, 28,376 households, and 17,409 families residing in the county.

2010 census
As of the census of 2010, there were 69,340 people, 28,360 households, and 19,683 families residing in the county. The population density was 91.91 people per square mile (35.49/km2). There were 33,065 housing units at an average density of 43.84 per square mile (16.93/km2). The racial makeup of the county was 90.60% White or European American, 4.08% African American, 0.19% Native American, 0.43% Asian, 0.03% Pacific Islander, 3.33% from other races, and 1.33% from two or more races. Of all races, 5.44% of the population were Hispanic or Latino.

There were 28,360 households, out of which 26.76% had children under the age of 18 living with them, 54.03% were married couples living together, 10.50% had a female householder with no husband present, and 30.60% were non-families. Of all households, 26.69% were made up of individuals, and 11.59% had someone living alone who was 65 years of age or older. The average household size was 2.41 and the average family size was 2.89.

In the county, the population breakdown by age is: 22.41% under the age of 18, 7.16% from 18 to 24, 23.96% from 25 to 44, 29.49% from 45 to 64, and 16.99% who were 65 years of age or older. The median age was 42.4 years. For every 100 females there were 97.69 males. For every 100 females age 18 and over, there were 95.42 males.

The median income for a household in the county was $30,668, and the median income for a family was $39,670. Males had a median income of $30,917 versus $26,182 for females. The per capita income for the county was $18,319. About 17.60% of families and 21.50% of the population were below the poverty line, including 32.60% of those under age 18 and 13.40% of those age 65 or over.

Religion
Since colonial times Wilkes County has been overwhelmingly Protestant Christian. The two earliest churches to be established in Wilkes were the Episcopalian and Presbyterian. However, by the 1850s the Southern Baptists had eclipsed them, and the Baptists have remained the dominant church in Wilkes. The county also contains a significant number of Methodist, Presbyterian, Episcopalian, and non-denominational Evangelical Protestant congregations. Historically, few Roman Catholics lived in Wilkes, but recent immigration from other U.S. States and especially by people of Hispanic descent has increased their numbers. Wilkes County has a single Catholic parish, Saint John Baptist de LaSalle Catholic Church in North Wilkesboro, which serves all the Catholics of Wilkes County. In contrast, relatively few Jews or members of other non-Christian faiths have settled in the county.

Government and politics

Since the American Civil War, Wilkes County has been heavily Republican, owing to its strong Unionist sentiment during the war, which partly stemmed from its rocky and infertile soil unsuited for plantation farming. The last Democratic presidential candidate to carry Wilkes County was Andrew Jackson in 1832. The Whig Party dominated politics in the county from 1836 until its dissolution in the middle 1850s. Since the formation of the Republican Party in 1854, Wilkes County has voted Republican in every election bar three: in 1856 it voted for "Know-Nothing" Millard Fillmore, in 1860 for Constitutional Unionist John Bell, and in 1912 for Progressive Theodore Roosevelt.

The primary governing body of Wilkes County follows a council–manager government format with a five-member Board of Commissioners and the County Manager. The current County Manager is John Yates. The current Commissioners are: Keith Elmore (chairman), Gary D. Blevins (Vice-chairman), David Gambill, Gary L. Blevins, and Eddie Settle.

Wilkes County is a member of the regional High Country Council of Governments.

In the North Carolina General Assembly, Wilkes is represented by Deanna Ballard in district 36 in the North Carolina State Senate, and by Sarah Stevens in district 90 and Jeffery Elmore in district 94 in the State House.

In the US Senate, the county is represented by Richard Burr and Thom Tillis. Wilkes is entirely in the Fifth District of the US House, represented by Virginia Foxx.

Wilkes County's economic struggles since 2000, and the county's strong support for Donald Trump in the 2016 presidential election and after, has led to Wilkes being prominently featured in numerous stories and articles by national news media outlets such as The New York Times, NBC News, PBS NewsHour, U.S. News & World Report, and MSNBC.

Economy
Despite its rural character and relatively small population, Wilkes County has been the birthplace of numerous large industries.  Lowe's, the second-largest chain of home-improvement stores in the nation (after The Home Depot) was started in Wilkes County in 1946. Until 2003, Lowe's had its corporate headquarters in Wilkes County, but the company has since relocated most of its corporate functions to Mooresville, North Carolina, a fast-growing suburb of Charlotte. However, Lowe's large office in Wilkesboro still houses many corporate departments, and Lowe's remains the county's second-largest employer. A telecommunications firm, Carolina West Wireless, was started in Wilkesboro in 1991 and is also headquartered in the county.

Other industries which started in Wilkes County are Lowes Foods (now headquartered in Winston-Salem) and The Northwestern Bank, which was once North Carolina's fourth-largest banking chain until it was merged with First Union Bank in 1986. The Carolina Mirror Company in North Wilkesboro, founded in the 1930s, was for many years the largest mirror factory in America. Today Gardner Glass Products Inc. still produces mirrors in North Wilkesboro. Holly Farms, in Wilkesboro, was the largest poultry producer in the Southeastern United States until it was bought by Tyson Foods in 1989. Wilkes County remains one of the largest producers of poultry in the Eastern United States, and many of the county's farmers are poultry farmers for Tyson Foods. Tyson is the largest employer in Wilkes.

Like many rural areas in North Carolina, Wilkes County has suffered since 2000 from the closing of nearly all of its textile and furniture factories, which formed a major part of its economic base. Most of these factories have moved to low-wage locations in Latin America and Asia, especially China and Vietnam. According to Stateline, the number of Wilkes County residents employed in manufacturing dropped from 8,548 in 2000 to approximately 4,000 as of 2015, a reduction of over 53%. From 2000 to 2014, the median household income in Wilkes declined by over 30%. However, from 2014 to 2017 the median household income increased by nearly 22%, and in 2017 Wilkes was ranked 47th out of 100 counties for "economic distress" by the North Carolina Department of Commerce.

Wine region
Wilkes County is part of the Yadkin Valley AVA, an American Viticultural Area. Wines made from grapes grown in Wilkes County may use the appellation Yadkin Valley on their labels. With the decline of tobacco farming, some Wilkes County farmers have switched to wine-making, and have hired experts from Europe and California for assistance. As a result, wine-making is growing in popularity in both Wilkes and surrounding counties.

In May of each year, Wilkes county celebrates the new wine industry with the Shine to Wine Festival, held in downtown North Wilkesboro.

Education
The Wilkes County Schools system has 22 schools ranging from pre-kindergarten to twelfth grade, including an early college high school. Those 22 schools are separated into 5 high schools, 4 middle schools and 13 elementary schools. There is only one charter school in Wilkes County: Bridges Charter School in State Road, North Carolina. The Elkin City Schools district also covers parts of Wilkes. Wilkes County has three private schools, all three are associated with one of the larger Protestant Christian churches in the county. The largest private school in Wilkes is Millers Creek Christian School. In recent years, the number of students being home schooled in Wilkes has steadily increased, while public school enrollment has decreased. The only college in Wilkes is Wilkes Community College (WCC), a public two-year college within the North Carolina Community College System.

Wilkes County is served by the Appalachian Regional Library.

Media
Wilkes County has two local newspapers:
 Wilkes Journal-Patriot – Founded in 1906, the Journal-Patriot is published one time per week.
 The Record of Wilkes – Published once per week on the internet, it usually focuses on the local arts scene in Wilkes.

The county has three radio stations:
 WKBC-FM (97.3 FM) – Adult contemporary (Hot AC) music and flagship station for football and basketball games of nearby Appalachian State University.
 WKBC (AM) (800 AM) – American country music.
 WWWC (AM) (1240 AM & 100.1 FM) – Southern Gospel music and local news and high school sports broadcasts.

Most of the county can pick up the Television Stations broadcasting from Winston-Salem

Wilkes County is also home to GoWilkes.com, an internet media source that allows residents to discuss current events and local happenings in real time. GoWilkes.com was voted the 2004 Small Business of the Year by the North Carolina Chamber of Commerce.

Hospitals 
Wilkes Medical Center was opened in 1952 as Wilkes General Hospital. In 2017, Wake Forest Baptist Health brought the hospital, at the time known as Wilkes Regional Medical Center, into their system. WMC is the largest hospital in northwestern North Carolina and is Wilkes County's fourth largest employer. West Park, formerly a large shopping center built in the 1970s, was, starting in 2000, transformed into a large medical park with numerous offices for physicians, medical specialists, pharmacies, physical therapists, and other medical and health-related fields.

Events and festivals
Wilkes County has strong musical roots, and those roots are displayed at:

It hosts the annual Shine to Wine Festival, in downtown North Wilkesboro. Held on the first Saturday of May, the Shine to Wine festival pays tribute to the county's heritage of growing from the Moonshine Capital of the World to what is now recognized as a strong viticultural industry.

Wilkes County is also home to the annual Brushy Mountain Apple Festival, which is held in downtown North Wilkesboro the first weekend in October. The festival, which attracts over 160,000 visitors each year, is one of the largest single-day arts and crafts fairs in the Southern United States.

Carolina in the Fall is another music festival each September in the Historic Downtown Wilkesboro and is hosted by the Heart of Folk and the Kruger Brothers. The festival and venue won an award at the IBMA and features music, wine and beer garden and food truck competition. It continues to grow in popularity.

The Carolina West Wireless Community Commons and Wilkes Communications Pavilion has "Concerts on the Commons," a live music concert series held from May through October annually. 
In 1988 legendary, Grammy-winning folk music guitarist Doc Watson and Bill Young started the Doc Watson Festival (later renamed the MerleFest music festival) in Wilkesboro. Held on the campus of Wilkes Community College, and named in honor of Doc's late son Merle Watson, MerleFest has grown into one of the largest folk and bluegrass music festivals in the United States, drawing an average of over 75,000 music fans each year. The festival has become the main fundraiser for the college, and brings over $10 million in estimated business and tourist revenues to Wilkes County and surrounding areas each year.

Communities

Towns
 Elkin (also in Surry County)
 North Wilkesboro (largest town)
 Ronda
 Wilkesboro (county seat)

Census-designated places
 Cricket
 Fairplains
 Hays
 Millers Creek
 Moravian Falls
 Mulberry
 Pleasant Hill

Unincorporated communities
 Call
 Clingman
 Darby
 Ferguson
 McGrady
 Parsonsville
 Purlear
 Roaring River
 Thurmond

Townships

 Antioch
 Beaver Creek
 Boomer
 Brushy Mountains
 Edwards
 Elk
 Jobs Cabin
 Lewis Fork
 Lovelace
 Moravian Falls
 Mulberry
 New Castle
 North Wilkesboro
 Rock Creek
 Reddies River
 Somers
 Stanton
 Traphill
 Union
 Walnut Grove
 Wilkesboro

Notable people
 Daniel Boone (1734–1820), explorer and pioneer, lived in Wilkes County for several years and married a Wilkes County native before moving west to Kentucky.
 John Brown (1738–1812), militia captain during the Revolutionary War, served as one of the state Treasurers (1782–1784), and served in the North Carolina state legislature (1784–1787).
 Chang and Eng Bunker (1811–1874), Siamese twins, who were a popular attraction in Asia, Europe, and North America in the nineteenth century, settled in Wilkes County in the 1850s, married two local sisters, and between them fathered 21 children.
 Robert Byrd (1917–2010), U.S. Senator from West Virginia 1959–2010; longest-serving Senator in American history.
 Benjamin Cleveland (1738–1806), colonel in the North Carolina militia during the Revolutionary War. He was one of the American commanders at the Battle of Kings Mountain in 1780.
 Tom Dula (Dooley) (1844–1868), Confederate veteran who was tried and hanged for the murder of his fiancée, Laura Foster; subject of the folk ballad "Tom Dooley".
 Zach Galifianakis (born 1969), actor and comedian.
 George Allen Gilreath (1834–1863), a captain in the Confederate Army during the American Civil War; killed while commanding the regiment which advanced the farthest into enemy lines during Pickett's Charge at the Battle of Gettysburg.
 James B. Gordon (1822–1864), a general of cavalry in the Confederate Army during the American Civil War.
 Deneen Graham (born 1964), the first black woman to be crowned Miss North Carolina (1983).
 Roger Hamby (born 1943), Former NASCAR driver and former team owner
 Junior Johnson (1931–2019), in the 1950s, Johnson became a legend in the rural South by consistently outrunning law-enforcement officials in auto chases while delivering homemade liquor (moonshine) to his customers. Johnson then became a champion NASCAR racer, winning 50 NASCAR races before his retirement.
 Sallie Chapman Gordon Law (1805–1894), first recorded Confederate nurse in the Civil War.
 William Ballard Lenoir (1751–1839), the first President of the University of North Carolina at Chapel Hill.
 Lucius Smith Lowe (1879-1940), Founder of North Wilkesboro Hardware, which later became Lowe's Home Improvement
 James Lucius Lowe (1918–1965), Founder of Lowes Foods, son of Lucius Smith Lowe, Co-Owner of Lowe's Home Improvement.
 Ruth Lowe Buchan (1912-1994), Daughter of Lucius Lowes and sister of James Lowe, After her father died in 1940 she inherited the North Wilkesboro Hardware store, who sold the company to her brother James Lowe that same year. James took on his brother-in-law Carl Buchan as a partner in 1943.
 Benny Parsons (1941–2007), NASCAR racer who won the 1973 NASCAR championship. After his retirement, he became a TV racing analyst.
 James Larkin Pearson (1879–1981), poet and newspaper publisher who served as North Carolina Poet Laureate from 1953 to 1981.
 Waylon Reavis (born 1978), musician, lead vocalist of Cleveland, Ohio metal band Mushroomhead.
 Shirrel Rhoades (born 1942), writer, publisher, professor, filmmaker, and the former executive vice president of Marvel Entertainment.
 Morgan Shepherd (born 1941), NASCAR driver for over fifty years; oldest driver to lead at least one lap in a NASCAR race. He currently owns his own team in the NASCAR Xfinity Series as the Shepherd Racing Ventures team
 Montford Stokes (1762–1842), United States Senator, Governor of North Carolina (1816–1832), appointed by President Andrew Jackson to lead the Federal Indian Commission in what is now Oklahoma; he is believed to be the only veteran of the Revolutionary War buried in that state.
 John Swofford (born 1948), since 1997 until June 2021 the Commissioner of the Atlantic Coast Conference (ACC); coordinator of the Bowl Championship Series (BCS) in college football.
 William Oliver Swofford (1945–2000), pop singer in the 1960s and 1970s (under the name Oliver), known for his hits Good Morning Starshine (featured in the Broadway musical Hair) and Jean, the theme song of the Oscar-winning film The Prime of Miss Jean Brodie.

Tom Dooley

As noted above, another well-known Wilkes native was Tom Dula (Dooley), a Confederate veteran of the American Civil War who was tried and hanged shortly after the war for the murder of his fiancée, Laura Foster. To this day many people believe that one of Dula's jealous ex-girlfriends murdered Laura Foster, that Dula was innocent of the crime, and that he accepted blame only to protect his former lover.

The case was given nationwide publicity by newspapers such as The New York Times and the New York Herald, and thus became a folk legend in the rural South. Dula's legend was popularized in 1958 by the top-selling Kingston Trio song "Hang Down Your Head, Tom Dooley." Dula's story was also turned into a 1959 movie starring Michael Landon as Dula, and each summer Bleu Moon Productions presents an outdoor drama based on the story.

In 2001, Tom Dula was ceremonially acquitted of all charges by the county.

See also
 List of counties in North Carolina
 National Register of Historic Places listings in Wilkes County, North Carolina
 North Carolina State Parks
 National Park Service

References

External links

 
 
 Wilkes County Chamber of Commerce

 
Counties of Appalachia
1778 establishments in North Carolina
Populated places established in 1778